Megacyllene acuta is a species of beetle in the family Cerambycidae. It was described by Ernst Friedrich Germar in 1821.

References

Megacyllene
Beetles described in 1821